(born February 26, 1985), professionally known by her birth name of , and nicknamed Mikitty, is a Japanese actress and former pop singer. After failing the audition to join girl group Morning Musume with the fourth generation members, Fujimoto debuted as a solo artist within Hello! Project in 2002 with the single "Aenai Nagai Nichiyōbi". Fujimoto later joined Morning Musume in 2003 along with the sixth generation and eventually became the leader of the group in 2007.

Early life

Fujimoto was born and raised in the Takikawa area of Hokkaidō, Japan. She has an older brother, who won a defamation case alongside Fujimoto in 2009.

Career

Early work: 2002–2003
Fujimoto originally started out as a solo singer in 2002 under the idol family Hello! Project,  becoming the first of six members to debut under Hello! Project after losing a Morning Musume audition. She is often called by fans as Aya Matsuura's rival, but in fact, they are the best of friends. After a successful performance on the music program on New Year's Eve, "Kōhaku Uta Gassen", producer Tsunku added her to Morning Musume as a sixth generation member in 2003.

She sang many of the lead lines in Morning Musume songs, especially after Natsumi Abe's graduation.  She and fellow Morning Musume member Asami Konno were also lent to Country Musume, a group that features "Country Girls from Hokkaidō", such as Miki and Asami (the group has been known, however, to include members not from the rural island—such as former featured singers Rika Ishikawa and Miuna Saito).

In October 2002, she was placed in the one-shot unit, Gomattou with two other prominent pop soloists under Hello! Project, Maki Goto (a former Morning Musume member), and Aya Matsuura. She was also in Hello! Project Shuffle groups Odoru 11, 11Water, H.P. All Stars and Sexy Otonajan.

In 2003, when Morning Musume was split into two groups, she was placed in Morning Musume Otomegumi.

Breakthrough: 2003–2008
On June 15, 2006, it was announced that Fujimoto and Aya Matsuura would join in a new Hello! Project duo called GAM. Their debut single was released on September 13, 2006, and after two other singles, their debut LP was released on May 23, 2007.

On May 6, 2007, after the graduation of then-leader Hitomi Yoshizawa, Fujimoto took her place as the fifth leader of Morning Musume.
  
On April 23, 2008, Fujimoto released a collaboration single, featuring Takao Horiuchi. In fall of 2008, Fujimoto played the part of Rizzo in the fall musical, Grease.

Personal life 
In March 2009, Fujimoto announced her engagement to Tomoharu Shōji from the comedy duo Shinagawa Shoji and graduated from Hello! Project. Fujimoto and Shoji married on July 3, 2009, in Hawaii. On March 27, 2012, Fujimoto gave birth to the couple's first child, a son.

Outside of her career as a performer, Miki has opened a chain of yakiniku restaurants in Japan. The first Yakinuku Mikitei opened on her 26th birthday, February 26, 2011, to much success. Three more restaurants were opened.　The restaurant chain was short-lived, and closed on June 29, 2012, following various incidents.

On August 1, 2015, Fujimoto gave birth to the couple's second child, a daughter.

Their third child was born in 2020.

Controversy 
On May 24, 2007, Fujimoto was featured in the Japanese gossip magazine Friday pictured walking with Tomoharu Shōji, a member of the comedy duo Shinagawa Shōji. Friday explained that they had a two-hour dinner together, drove to Fujimoto's apartment, then went to the sauna, returning to Shōji's apartment just after midnight. It soon became apparent that she was to be involved in a scandal that would jeopardize her position in Morning Musume. After seeing the article, Up-Front Agency had no intention to deal with the situation since there was no proof of them dating. On the May 26, 2007 edition of Young Town Doyōbi (a radio show with Ai Takahashi, Fujimoto and Sanma Akashiya), she confirmed that the pictures were of her, and that she had been going out with Tomoharu Shōji. She also mentioned that she spoke to the head of Up-Front Agency, Naoki Yamazaki, about the situation. On June 1, 2007, Fujimoto resigned from her position in Morning Musume. She continued with GAM and remained contracted with Hello! Project and Up-Front Agency.

Discography and releases

Albums

Singles

DVDs

Photobooks

Acting

Movies 
 2003 –

Dramas 
 2002 – 
 2004 – 
 2009 – 
 2009 –

Theater 
 2008 –

Musicals 
 2006 –  as Hecate
 2008 – Grease: The Musical as Rizzo

Radio 
 2002–2003 – 
 2002–2007 – 
 2004–2007 –

References

External links 

 old/official Hello! Project profile
  J.P ROOM Inc official site
  Miki Fujimoto Official Blog
 
 Hello! Project Stats
 Yankinuki Mikitei company website
 Miki Fujimoto's YouTube channel

 

11Water members
1985 births
Country Musume members
Japanese radio personalities
GAM (group) members
Japanese female idols
Hello! Project solo singers
Dream Morning Musume members
Living people
Morning Musume members
Musicians from Hokkaido